Croilia mossambica, the burrowing goby or naked goby, is a species of goby native fresh, brackish and marine waters of Mozambique, South Africa and Madagascar. It can reach a length of  TL. It is currently the only known member of its genus.

References

Croilia
Fish described in 1955
Taxonomy articles created by Polbot